Gold Hill or Goldhill is a ghost town in the West Kootenay region of southeastern British Columbia. The former mining community is on the northeast side of the Lardeau River.

Name origin
In the 1890s, the trail from Lardeau to Trout Lake joined the Lardeau River at Cascade Creek, just upstream from the future Gold Hill.

Second Crossing was the original name, being the second place the railway crossed the river. In 1903, Edward Mobbs established a town during the goldrush, which he called Uto, but then renamed as Goldhill within days.

Some early newspaper reports did not clearly differentiate between the crossing and Bosworth, which might suggest the commercial enterprises were found somewhere in between.

Ferry and road bridges
During the railway construction, grading northwestward had reached Duncan City (Howser) by 1899, but clearing extended well beyond.

When the reaction ferry barge was launched for the season in June 1901, the wild current took up the slack in the cable, creating a sudden jerk. The cable drum snapped off and two of the seven railway engineers on board were propelled overboard. Although both were rescued, the barge was destroyed on rocks downstream.

Assumedly, the ferry operated at least until the permanent rail bridge opened in late 1902. A road or footbridge opened at least within a few years.

In 1964–65, the highway bridge underwent extensive repairs. It is unclear whether this was the former rail bridge and current highway bridge.

Railway
The narrowed valley at this point provided a good location for a bridge. The northwestward advance of the Arrowhead and Kootenay Railway rail head reached Second Crossing in November 1901. That month, a temporary bridge was completed, to be replaced by a truss bridge in the spring. That December, five construction crew sustained minor injuries when their handcar collided with a stationary flatcar just south of the crossing. After a break over the winter, tracklaying on this Canadian Pacific Railway (CP) subsidiary resumed the following May and was completed to the foot of Trout Lake in early June. During 1904, Gold Hill may also have been an unofficial flag stop.

In 1942, CP abandoned the line and the rail bed was adapted to become a public highway.

Community
Both Edward Mobbs and Hugh McDonald applied for liquor licences in 1901, but only Joseph Howson, who ran the Ottawa House hotel, was granted one. Months later, he transferred the licence to McDonald.

By summer 1903, a new mining camp held a large number of prospectors. At the time, the wagon road from Poplar Creek was upgraded.

Although the Ulvin Bros applied for a liquor licence that November, their Miners' Hotel may well have opened months later. Casey and Murphy opened the Hotel Bosworth in the new year, but the location could have been closer to Bosworth. In March 1904, Hawthorne Bros completed their store. During the brief 1904–1906 post office existence, Charles Hawthorne was postmaster. By summer 1904, the Hotel Bosworth had become a Casey and Mobbs partnership, and a large number of prospectors worked in the surrounding hills.

After a winter closure, the Ulvin hotel reopened in spring 1905. The gold boom over, the town quickly faded.

During 1913–1915 and 1922, gold dredging operations took place on the river.

The train made a one-hour meal stop at the Miners' Hotel into the 1920s. Emma Rear, step-daughter of John Ulvin, later operated the hotel. One account suggests closure in the 1940s and the later dismantling and removal of the building to Gerrard. Another account suggests the hotel was still operating into the 1950s.

All the earlier buildings have since disappeared and only a few scattered later residences remain.

Agriculture
In 1912, land was promoted for developing orchards.

Map

Footnotes

References

Ghost towns in British Columbia
West Kootenay
Kootenay Land District